Chinnadagudihundi is a railway station on Mysore–Chamarajanagar branch line. The station is located in Mysore district, Karnataka state, India.

Location
Chinnadagudihundi railway station is located near Chinnadagudihundi village in Mysore district.

History 
The project cost . The gauge conversion work of the  stretch was completed.  whether he has received any representation regarding the reopening of the way side halt at Chinnadagudihundi on Mysore-Chamarajanagar Section in Mysore Division, Southern  Railway. In 1958 this matter is under examined 
There are six trains running forward and backward in this route. Five of them are slow-moving Passenger trains.

References

Railway stations in Mysore district